"Physical Favours" is a song by New Zealand singer and songwriter Sharon O'Neill. The song was released in September 1987 as the first single from her fifth studio album, Danced in the Fire (1987). It was O'Neill's first release on the Polydor Records label.

Background and release
O'Neill signed with CBS records in 1978 and between 1979 and 1983, released four top twenty albums in New Zealand. A number of disputes followed, leading to an almost 5-year break between releasing music. O'Neill continued to write music however and in 1987 once the CBS contract had expired,O'Neill promptly signed a two-album deal with Polydor Records. "Physical Favours" was the first release.

Track listing
7" (Polydor – 887 032-7) 
Side A "Physical Favours" 
Side B "Silk or Stone"

Charts

Personnel
Alan Manfield - DX7, Hammond organ, Guitar
Michael Hegarty - Bass
Tommy Emmanuel - Guitar
Jon Farriss - Drums
Maggie McKinney, Mark Williams - Backing vocals

References

1987 songs
1987 singles
Sharon O'Neill songs
Songs written by Sharon O'Neill